Connor v Pukerau Store Ltd [1981] 1 NZLR 384 is a cited case in New Zealand regarding "subject to finance" clauses in conditional contracts, which requires a purchaser to make all reasonable steps to obtain finance, including asking the vendor to finance the transaction.

References

Court of Appeal of New Zealand cases
New Zealand contract case law
1981 in New Zealand law
1981 in case law